The Federal Theatre Project (FTP; 1935–1939) was a theatre program established during the Great Depression as part of the New Deal to fund live artistic performances and entertainment programs in the United States. It was one of five Federal Project Number One projects sponsored by the Works Progress Administration, created not as a cultural activity but as a relief measure to employ artists, writers, directors, and theater workers. National director Hallie Flanagan shaped the FTP into a federation of regional theaters that created relevant art, encouraged experimentation in new forms and techniques, and made it possible for millions of Americans to see live theatre for the first time. Although The Federal Theatre project consumed only 0.5% of the allocated budget from the WPA and was widely considered a commercial and critical success, the project became a source of heated political contention. Congress responded to the project's racial integration and accusations of Communist infiltration and cancelled its funding effective June 30, 1939. One month before the project's end, drama critic Brooks Atkinson summarized: "Although the Federal Theatre is far from perfect, it has kept an average of ten thousand people employed on work that has helped to lift the dead weight from the lives of millions of Americans. It has been the best friend the theatre as an institution has ever had in this country."

Background

Part of the Works Progress Administration, the Federal Theatre Project was a New Deal program established August 27, 1935, funded under the Emergency Relief Appropriation Act of 1935. Of the $4.88 billion allocated to the WPA, $27 million was approved for the employment of artists, musicians, writers and actors under the WPA's Federal Project Number One.

Government relief efforts funding theatre through the Federal Emergency Relief Administration and Civil Works Administration in the two preceding years were amateur experiments regarded as charity, not a theatre program. The Federal Theatre Project was a new approach to unemployment in the theatre profession. Only those certified as employable could be offered work, and that work was to be within the individual's defined skills and trades.

"For the first time in the relief experiments of this country the preservation of the skill of the worker, and hence the preservation of his self-respect, became important," wrote Hallie Flanagan, director of the Federal Theatre Project. A theater professor at Vassar College who had studied the operation of government-sponsored theatre abroad for the Guggenheim Foundation, Flanagan was chosen to lead the Federal Theatre Project by WPA head Harry Hopkins. Flanagan and Hopkins had been classmates at Grinnell College. Roosevelt and Hopkins selected her despite considerable pressure to choose someone from the commercial theatre industry; they believed the project should be led by someone with academic credentials and a national perspective.
Flanagan had the daunting task of building a nationwide theater program to employ thousands of unemployed artists in as little time as possible. The Theatre industry had struggled financially prior to the financial collapse of 1929. By that time it was already threatened with extinction due to the growing popularity of films and radio, but the commercial theatre was reluctant to adapt its practices. Many actors, technicians and stagehands had suffered since 1914, when movies began to replace stock, vaudeville and other live stage performances nationwide. Sound motion pictures displaced 30,000 musicians. In the Great Depression, people with little money for entertainment found an entire evening of entertainment at the movies for 25 cents, while commercial theatre charged $1.10 to $2.20 admission to cover the cost of theater rental, advertising and fees to performers and union technicians. Unemployed directors, actors, designers, musicians and stage crew took any kind of work they were able to find, whatever it paid, and charity was often their only recourse.

"This is a tough job we're asking you to do," Hopkins told Flanagan at their first meeting in May 1935. "I don't know why I still hang on to the idea that unemployed actors get just as hungry as anybody else."

Hopkins promised "a free, adult, uncensored theatre" — something Flanagan spent the next four years trying to build. She emphasized the development of local and regional theatre, "to lay the foundation for the development of a truly creative theatre in the United States with outstanding producing centers in each of those regions which have common interests as a result of geography, language origins, history, tradition, custom, occupations of the people."

Operation
On October 24, 1935, Flanagan prefaced her instructions on the Federal Theatre's operation with a statement of purpose:

The primary aim of the Federal Theatre Project is the reemployment of theatre workers now on public relief rolls: actors, directors, playwrights, designers, vaudeville artists, stage technicians, and other workers in the theatre field. The far reaching purpose is the establishment of theatres so vital to community life that they will continue to function after the program of this Federal Project is completed.

Within a year the Federal Theatre Project employed 15,000 men and women, paying them $23.86 a week while the Actors Equity Association's minimum was $40.00. These men and women would only do six performances a week and have only four hours per day to rehearse. During its nearly four years of existence 30 million people attended FTP productions in more than 200 theaters nationwide — renting many that had been shuttered — as well as parks, schools, churches, clubs, factories, hospitals and closed-off streets. Its productions totaled approximately 1,200, not including its radio programs. Because the Federal Theatre was created to employ and train people, not to generate revenue, no provision was made for the receipt of money when the project began. At its conclusion, 65 percent of its productions were still presented free of charge. The total cost of the Federal Theatre Project was $46 million.

"In any consideration of the cost of the Federal Theatre," Flanagan wrote, "it should be borne in mind that the funds were allotted, according to the terms of the Relief Act of 1935, to pay wages to unemployed people. Therefore, when Federal Theatre was criticized for spending money, it was criticized for doing what it was set up to do."

The FTP established five regional centers in New York, New York, Boston (Northeast), Chicago (Midwest), Los Angeles (West), and New Orleans (South). The FTP did not operate in every state, since many lacked a sufficient number of unemployed people in the theatre profession. The project in Alabama was closed in January 1937 when its personnel were transferred to a new unit in Georgia. Only one event was presented in Arkansas. Units created in Minnesota, Missouri and Wisconsin were closed in 1936; projects in Indiana, Nebraska, Rhode Island and Texas were discontinued in 1937; and the Iowa project was closed in 1938.

Many of the notable artists of the time participated in the Federal Theatre Project, including Susan Glaspell who served as Midwest bureau director. The legacy of the Federal Theatre Project can also be found in beginning the careers of a new generation of theater artists. Arthur Miller, Orson Welles, John Houseman, Martin Ritt, Elia Kazan, Joseph Losey, Marc Blitzstein and Abe Feder are among those who became established, in part, through their work in the Federal Theatre.  Blitzstein, Houseman, Welles and Feder collaborated on the controversial production, The Cradle Will Rock.

Living Newspaper

Living Newspapers were plays written by teams of researchers-turned-playwrights. These men and women clipped articles from newspapers about current events, often hot button issues like farm policy, syphilis testing, the Tennessee Valley Authority, and housing inequity. These newspaper clippings were adapted into plays intended to inform audiences, often with progressive or left-wing themes. Triple-A Plowed Under, for instance, attacked the U.S. Supreme Court for killing an aid agency for farmers. These politically themed plays quickly drew criticism from members of Congress.

Although the undisguised political invective in the Living Newspaper productions sparked controversy, they also proved popular with audiences.  As an art form, the Living Newspaper is perhaps the Federal Theatre's most well-known work.

Problems with the Federal Theatre Project and Congress intensified when the State Department objected to the first Living Newspaper, Ethiopia, about Haile Selassie and his nation's struggles against Benito Mussolini's invading Italian forces. The U.S. government soon mandated that the FTP, a government agency, could not depict foreign heads of state on the stage for fear of diplomatic backlash. Playwright and director Elmer Rice, head of the New York office of the FTP, resigned in protest and was succeeded by his assistant, Philip W. Barber.

New productions
Numbers following the city of origin indicate the number of additional cities where the play was presented.

African-American theatre

Capitalizing on the FTP's national network and inherent diversity of artists, the Federal Theatre established specific chapters dedicated to showcasing and celebrating the work of previously under represented artists. Including the French Theatre in Los Angeles, the German Theater in New York City, and the Negro Theatre Unit which had several chapters across the country, with its largest office in New York City. The FTP set up 17 so-called Negro Theatre Units (NTU) in cities throughout the United States. The NTU had additional offices in Hartford, Boston, Salem, Newark, and Philadelphia in the East; Seattle Portland, and Los Angeles in the West; Cleveland, Detroit, Peoria, and Chicago in the Midwest; and Raleigh, Atlanta, Birmingham, and New Orleans in the South. There were additional units in San Francisco Oklahoma, Durham, Camden, and Buffalo. By the project's conclusion 22 American cities had served as headquarters for black theater units.

The New York Negro Theatre Unit was the most well known. Two of the four federal theaters in New York City—Lafayette Theatre and the Negro Youth Theater— were dedicated to the Harlem community with the intention of developing unknown theatre artists.

Both theatre projects were headquartered at the Lafayette Theatre in Harlem, where some 30 plays were presented. The first was Frank H. Wilson's folk drama, Walk Together Chillun (1936), about the deportation of 100 African-Americans from the South to the North to work for low wages. The second was Conjur' Man Dies (1936), a comedy-mystery adapted by Arna Bontemps and Countee Cullen from Rudolph Fisher's novel. The most popular production was the third, which came to be called the Voodoo Macbeth (1936), director Orson Welles's adaptation of Shakespeare's play set on a mythical island suggesting the Haitian court of King Henri Christophe.

The New York Negro Theatre Unit also oversaw projects from the African American Dance Unit featuring Nigerian artists displaced by the Ethiopian Crisis. These projects employed over 1,000 black actors and directors. The Negro Actors' Guild of America incorporated on October 1, 1936 in the state of New York. The ten Articles for the Certificate of Incorporation addressed the welfare, appreciation and development of black artists. 

The Federal Theatre Project was distinguished for its focus on racial injustice. Flanagan expressly ordered her subordinates to follow the WPA policy against racial prejudice. In fact when it came to making decisions on a national level for the project, the Federal Theatre Regulation mandated that "there may be racial representation in all national planning". A specific example of the FTP's adherence to an anti-prejudicial environment came when a white project manager in Dallas was fired for attempted to segregate black and white theater technicians on a railroad car. Additionally, the white assistant director of the project was pulled because "he was unable to work amicably" with the black artists.

The FTP overtly sought out relationships with the African American community including Carter Woodson of the Association for the Study of Negro Life and History, as well as Walter White of the NAACP. One of the existing stipulations from the Works Progress Administration for employment in the FTP was prior professional theater experience. However when encountered with 40 young jobless black playwrights national director Hallie Flanagan waived the WPA requirement in the interest of providing a platform and training ground for new young playwrights. During a national conference Flanagan proposed that the leadership of the Harlem chapter of the FTP be led by an African American artist. Rose McClendon, an established actor at the time, publicly argued against this proposal and instead suggested that initially an established white theater artist take the mantle with the understanding and intention of satisfying the WPA's prior professional theater experience clause and giving way to black artists to lead the chapter. This argument from McClendon received support from Edna Thomas, Harry Edwards, Carlton Moss, Abraham Hale Jr., Augusta Smith and Dick Campbell.

This crusade for equality eventually became a sticking point for the Dies Committee, which pulled funding for the Federal Theater Project citing "racial equality forms a vital part of the Communist dictatorship and practices".

New drama productions
Numbers following the city of origin indicate the number of additional cities where the play was presented.

Standard drama productions
Numbers following the city of origin indicate the number of additional cities where the play was presented.

Dance drama

New productions
Numbers following the city of origin indicate the number of additional cities where the play was presented.

Foreign-language drama
These plays were given their first professional production in the United States by the Federal Theatre Project. Titles are shown as they appeared on event programs. Numbers following the city of origin indicate the number of additional cities where the play was presented.

New productions

German

Spanish

Yiddish

Radio

The Federal Theatre of the Air began weekly broadcasts March 15, 1936. For three years the radio division of the Federal Theatre Project presented an average of 3,000 programs annually on commercial stations and the NBC, Mutual and CBS networks. The major programs originated in New York; radio divisions were also created in 11 states.
Series included Professional Parade, hosted by Fred Niblo; Experiments in Symphonic Drama, original stories written for classical music; Gilbert and Sullivan Light Opera, the complete works performed by Federal Theatre actors and recordings by D'Oyly Carte; Ibsen's Plays, performances of 12 major plays; Repertory Theatre of the Air, presenting literary classics; Contemporary Theatre, presenting plays by modern authors; and the interview program, Exploring the Arts and Sciences.

The radio division presented a wide range of programs on health and safety, art, music and history. The American Legion sponsored James Truslow Adams's Epic of America. The children's program, Once Upon a Time, and Paul de Kruif's Men Against Death were both honored by the National Committee for Education by Radio. In March 1939, at the invitation of the BBC, Flanagan broadcast the story of the Federal Theatre Project to Britain. Asked to expand the program to encompass the entire WPA, the radio division produced No Help Wanted, a dramatization by William N. Robson with music by Leith Stevens. The Times called it "the best broadcast ever sent us from the Americas".

Federal Dance Project
The Federal Dance Project (FDP) was a short-lived entity that was ultimately absorbed into the Federal Theater Project. Dancer Helen Tamiris was the central figure of the FDP, which existed as an independent entity from January 1936 until October 1937.

Funding pulled by Congress

In May 1938, Martin Dies Jr., director of The House Committee on Un-American Activities specifically targeted the WPA's Federal Theatre Project. Assailing Flanagan's professional character and political affiliations, the committee heard testimony from former Federal Theatre Project members who were unhappy with their tenure with the project. Flanagan testified that the FTP was pro-American in so far as the work celebrated the constitutional freedoms of speech and expression to address the relevant and pressing concerns of its citizens.

Citing the Federal Theatre's call for racial equality, impending war, and further perpetuating the rumor that the FTP was a front for radical and communist activities Congress ended federal funding as of June 30, 1939. That immediately putting 8,000 people out of work across the country. Although the overall financial cost of the FTP was minuscule in the grand scheme of the WPA's budget, Congress determined that the average American did not consider theater as a viable recipient of their tax dollars. Following the decision, Flanagan's stepdaughter, Joanne Bentley quoted an unnamed Congressmen saying "Culture! What the Hell—Let 'em have a pick and shovel!"

Members of Congress criticized a total of 81 of the Federal Theatre Project's 830 major titles for their content in public statements, committee hearings, on the floor of the Senate or House, or in testimony before Congressional committees. Only 29 were original productions of the Federal Theatre Project. The others included 32 revivals or stock productions; seven plays that were initiated by community groups; five that were never produced by the project; two works of Americana; two classics; one children's play; one Italian translation; and one Yiddish play.

The Living Newspapers productions that drew criticism were Injunction Granted, a history of American labor relations; One-Third of a Nation, about housing conditions in New York; Power, about energy from the consumer's point of view; and Triple A Plowed Under, on farming problems in America. Another that was criticized, on the history of medicine, was not completed.

Dramas criticized by Congress were American Holiday, about a small-town murder trial; Around the Corner, a Depression-era comedy; Chalk Dust, about an urban high school; Class of '29, the Depression years as seen through young college graduates; Created Equal, a review of American life since colonial times; It Can't Happen Here, Sinclair Lewis's parable of democracy and dictatorship; No More Peace, Ernst Toller's satire on dictatorships; Professor Mamlock, about Nazi persecution of Jews; Prologue to Glory, about the early life of Abraham Lincoln; The Sun and I, about Joseph in Egypt; and Woman of Destiny, about a female President who works for peace.

Negro Theatre Unit productions that drew criticism were The Case of Philip Lawrence, a portrait of life in Harlem; Did Adam Sin?, a review of black folklore with music; and Haiti, a play about Toussaint Louverture.

Also criticized for their content were the dance dramas Candide, from Voltaire; How Long Brethren, featuring songs by future Guggenheim Fellowship recipient Lawrence Gellert; and Trojan Incident, a translation of Euripides with a prologue from Homer.

Help Yourself, a satire on high-pressure business tactics, was among the comedies criticized by Congress. Others were Machine Age, about mass production; On the Rocks by George Bernard Shaw; and The Tailor Becomes a Storekeeper.

Children's plays singled out were Mother Goose Goes to Town, and Revolt of the Beavers, which the New York American called a "pleasing fantasy for children".

The musical Sing for Your Supper also met with Congressional criticism, although its patriotic finale, "Ballad for Americans", was chosen as the theme song of the 1940 Republican National Convention.

Cultural references
A fictionalized view of the Federal Theatre Project is presented in the 1999 film Cradle Will Rock, in which Cherry Jones portrays Hallie Flanagan.

References

Citations

Cited works 
 Goldstein, Malcolm. The Political Stage: American Drama and Theater of the Great Depression. Oxford University Press, 1974.
 Jefferson, Miles M. "The Negro on Broadway, 1947-1948". Phylon (1940–1956), vol. 9, no. 2, 1948, p. 99., doi:10.2307/272176.
 Norflett, Linda Kerr. “Rosetta LeNoire: The Lady and Her Theatre". Black American Literature Forum, vol. 17, no. 2, 1983, p. 69., doi:10.2307/2904582.
 Pool, Rosey E. "The Negro Actor in Europe". Phylon (1940–1956), vol. 14, no. 3, 1 Sept. 1953, pp. 258–267. JSTOR, www.jstor.org/stable/10.2307/271466?refreqid=search-gateway:0a4e4b9a53d893b23f2ee26ce846367f.
 Roses, Lorraine Elena. Black Bostonians and the Politics of Culture, 1920-1940. University of Massachusetts Press, 2017.
 Shandell, Jonathan. The American Negro Theatre and the Long Civil Rights Era. University of Iowa Press, 2018.

Further reading
 Batiste, Stephanie Leigh. Darkening Mirrors: Imperial Representation in Depression-Era African American Performance (Duke University Press; 2012) 352 pages; Explores African-Americans' participation on stage and screen; especially FTP's "voodoo" Macbeth.
 Bentley, Joanne. Hallie Flanagan: A Life in the American Theatre (1988).
 Flanagan, Hallie. Arena: The Story of the Federal Theatre (1940) online 1985 edition : Free Borrowing : Internet Archive
 Frost, Leslie. "'Don’t Be Mean' and Other Lessons from Children’s Plays of the Federal Theatre Project." Ludics: Play as Humanistic Inquiry ed. by Vassiliki Rapti and Eric Gordon; (Palgrave Macmillan, Singapore, 2021) pp. 403-426.
 Frost, Leslie Elaine, Dreaming America: Popular Front Ideals and Aesthetics in Children’s Plays of the Federal Theatre Project (Ohio State University Press, 2013).
  PDF
 Hurt, Melissa, “Oppressed, Stereotyped, and Silenced: Atlanta’s Black History with the Federal Theatre Project.” in Constructions of Race in Southern Theatre: From Federalism to the Federal Theatre Project edited by Noreen Barnes McLain. (University of Alabama Press, 2003).
 
 Mathews, Jane DeHart. Federal Theatre, 1935-1939: Plays, Relief, and Politics (Princeton UP 1967) 
 Moore, Cecelia. The Federal Theatre Project in the American South: The Carolina Playmakers and the Quest for American Drama (Lexington Books, 2017).
 Newton, Christopher. "In Order to Obtain the Desired Effect": Italian Language Theater Sponsored by the Federal Theatre Project in Boston, 1935–39," Italian Americana, (Sep 1994) 12#2 pp 187–200.
 O'Connor, John, and Lorraine Brown, eds. Free, Adult, Uncensored: The Living History of the Federal Theatre Project (1978).
 O'Connor, John. "The Drama of Farming: The Federal Theatre Living Newspapers on Agriculture." Prospects 15 (1990): 325-358.
 Osborne, Elizabeth. "Storytelling, Chiggers, and the Bible Belt: The Georgia Experiment as the Public Face of the Federal Theatre Project." Theatre History Studies 31.1 (2011): 9-26 excerpt @ muse.jhu.edu
 
  excerpt @ amazon
 Schwartz, Bonnie Nelson. Voices from the Federal Theatre. (Madison: University of Wisconsin Press, 2003); includes interviews with such Federal Theatre actors, playwrights, directors, designers, producers, and dancers as Arthur Miller, Jules Dassin, Katherine Dunham, Rosetta LeNoire, John Houseman etc; primary sources.
 White, Leslie. "Eugene O'Neill and the Federal Theatre Project." Resources for American Literary Study 17.1 (1990): 63-85 online.
 Witham, Barry B. The Federal Theatre Project: A Case Study (2004). excerpt @ amazon

External links

 Library of Congress
 Coast to Coast: The Federal Theatre Project, 1935–1939
 American Memory—The New Deal Stage: Selections from the Federal Theatre Project, 1935–1939
 Billy Rose Theatre Division, New York Public Library for the Performing Arts
 Hallie Flanagan papers, 1923–1963
 Federal Theatre Project designs, 1935–1939
 Federal Theatre Project lists of plays, 1938
 WPA Radio Scripts, 1936–1940
 Federal Theatre Project Collection at George Mason University
Federal Theatre Project Collection, 1936–1939, CTC.1979.02, Curtis Theatre Collection, Special Collections Department, University of Pittsburgh
 BlackPast.org: Federal Theatre Project (Negro Units) 
 "An Hour Upon the Stage: The Brief Life of Federal Theatre".  Humanities: The Magazine of the National Endowment for the Humanities, July/August 2003
 American Studies at the University of Virginia: Triple A Plowed Under — full text plus recreation-for-radio production of the Federal Theater Project drama. 
 Encyclopedia of Oklahoma History and Culture — Federal Theater Project
"Federal Theater Project in Washington State", by Sarah Guthu — from the Great Depression in Washington State Project

 
National theatres
New Deal projects of the arts
Theatre in the United States
Works Progress Administration
New Deal agencies
1935 establishments in Washington, D.C.
Government agencies established in 1935
Arts organizations established in 1935
Cultural history of the United States
1939 disestablishments in Washington, D.C.